"Mathematics" is the debut single from Manchester band Cherry Ghost. It was released as a digital download on March 26, 2007 and on CD and 7" vinyl on April 9, 2007. It went to #57 on the UK singles chart. "Mathematics" acquired the title "song of the week" on BBC Radio 2 in early 2007, and Zane Lowe of BBC Radio 1 declared the song "the hottest record in the world" in February 2007. Jimi Goodwin of Doves plays bass and drums on the single. The B-side "Junebug" is a Sparklehorse cover.

The song's inspiration likely stemmed from songwriter Simon Aldred's Bachelor's degree in Pure Mathematics from the University of Leeds.

Two music videos were made for the song. The first, a self-produced video featuring a man in a bird costume, was posted in late 2006. The second, featuring Simon Aldred's family home movies, appeared on Heavenly Records' website in early 2008.

Track listings
All songs written by Simon Aldred except where noted.

Promo CD (HVN167CDRP):
 Released in March 2007
 "Mathematics" (Edit) – 3:58
 "Mathematics" (Album Version) – 4:34

CD (HVN167CD):
 "Mathematics" – 4:34
 "Throw Me to the Dogs" – 3:44
 "I Need You" – 4:56

7" vinyl (HVN167):
 "Mathematics" – 4:34
 "Junebug" (Linkous) – 2:01

Digital download (UK iTunes only):
 "Mathematics" – 4:34
 "Throw Me to the Dogs" – 3:44

References

Heavenly Recordings singles
2007 songs
Songs written by Cherry Ghost
2007 singles
Cherry Ghost songs